Growing Gardener is a sculpture by Inges Idee, installed in Tokyo, Japan.

Reception
Time Out Tokyo editors Matt Schley and Kaila Imada included Growing Gardener in their 2019 list of the city's "best public art sculptures", writing: "This quirky, cheerful sculpture of a gnome dwarfed by his ludicrously long red hat is the work of German artist collective Inges Idee and can be found near Osaki Station. He's a fun one to catch and will certainly bring a smile to your face – you can sometimes even spot him while you're passing Osaki Station on the JR Yamanote Line."

References

External links

 

Outdoor sculptures in Tokyo
Statues in Japan